Bereketli may refer to:

Bereketli, Ağlı, a village in the District of Ağlı, Kastamonu Province, Turkey
Bereketli, Besni, a village in the District of Besni, Adıyaman Province, Turkey
Bereketli, Ergani
Bereketli, Nazilli, a village in the District of Nazilli, Aydın Province, Turkey
Bereketli, Şenkaya
Bereketli, Silvan
Bereketli Garagum Nature Reserve, a desert nature reserve (zapovednik) of Turkmenistan

See also
Bereket (disambiguation)